Corona or La Corona is a hamlet in Manajanabo, Santa Clara, Villa Clara, Cuba.

References 

Populated places in Villa Clara Province